Pingasa hypoxantha is a moth of the family Geometridae first described by Louis Beethoven Prout in 1916. It is found in the Democratic Republic of the Congo and Kenya.

Subspecies
Pingasa hypoxantha hypoxantha (Kenya)
Pingasa hypoxantha holochroa Prout, 1916 (Democratic Republic of the Congo)

References

Pseudoterpnini
Moths described in 1916
Taxa named by Louis Beethoven Prout